The 1979–80 NBA season was the Bullets 19th season in the NBA and their 7th season in the city of Washington, D.C.

Offseason

Draft picks

Roster

Regular season

Season standings

Notes
 z, y – division champions
 x – clinched playoff spot

Record vs. opponents

Game log

Regular season

|- align="center" bgcolor="#ffcccc"
| 1
| October 12
| Philadelphia
| L 92–93
|
|
|
| Capital Centre
| 0–1
|- align="center" bgcolor="#ffcccc"
| 2
| October 13
| @ New York
|
|
|
|
|Madison Square Garden
|
|- align="center" bgcolor="#ccffcc"
| 3
| October 17
| Atlanta
|
|
|
|
|Capital Centre
|
|- align="center" bgcolor="#ffcccc"
| 4
| October 19
| @ Boston
| L 93–130
|
|
|
| Boston Garden
| 1–3
|- align="center" bgcolor="#ccffcc"
| 5
| October 20
| Detroit
|
|
|
|
|Capital Centre
|
|- align="center" bgcolor="#ffcccc"
| 6
| October 24
| @ Detroit
|
|
|
|
|Pontiac Silverdome
|
|- align="center" bgcolor="#ffcccc"
| 7
| October 26
| @ Indiana
|
|
|
|
|Market Square Arena
|
|- align="center" bgcolor="#ccffcc"
| 8
| October 31
| Cleveland
|
|
|
|
|Capital Centre
|

|- align="center" bgcolor="#ffcccc"
| 9
| November 3
| Boston
| L 97–118
|
|
|
| Capital Centre
| 3–6
|- align="center" bgcolor="#ccffcc"
| 10
| November 9
| San Antonio
|
|
|
|
|Capital Centre
|
|- align="center" bgcolor="#ffcccc"
| 11
| November 10
| @ Atlanta
|
|
|
|
|Omni Coliseum
|
|- align="center" bgcolor="#ccffcc"
| 12
| November 13
| @ New York
|
|
|
|
|Madison Square Garden
|
|- align="center" bgcolor="#ccffcc"
| 13
| November 14
| Chicago
|
|
|
|
|Capital Centre
|
|- align="center" bgcolor="#ccffcc"
| 14
| November 16
| @ New Jersey
|
|
|
|
|Rutgers Athletic Center
|
|- align="center" bgcolor="#ccffcc"
| 15
| November 17
| Utah
|
|
|
|
|Capital Centre
|
|- align="center" bgcolor="#ffcccc"
| 16
| November 21
| Cleveland
|
|
|
|
|Capital Centre
|
|- align="center" bgcolor="#ffcccc"
| 17
| November 23
| @ San Antonio
|
|
|
|
|HemisFair Arena
|
|- align="center" bgcolor="#ccffcc"
| 18
| November 24
| @ Houston
|
|
|
|
|The Summit
|
|- align="center" bgcolor="#ffcccc"
| 19
| November 27
| Denver
|
|
|
|
|Capital Centre
|
|- align="center" bgcolor="#ffcccc"
| 20
| November 28
| @ Philadelphia
| L 102–120
|
|
|
| The Spectrum
| 9–11
|- align="center" bgcolor="#ffcccc"
| 21
| November 30
| Indiana
|
|
|
|
|Capital Centre
|

|- align="center" bgcolor="#ccffcc"
| 22
| December 1
| New Jersey
|
|
|
|
|Capital Centre
|
|- align="center" bgcolor="#ffcccc"
| 23
| December 5
| New York
|
|
|
|
|Capital Centre
|
|- align="center" bgcolor="#ccffcc"
| 24
| December 8
| Atlanta
|
|
|
|
|Capital Centre
|
|- align="center" bgcolor="#ffcccc"
| 25
| December 11
| Phoenix
|
|
|
|
|Capital Centre
|
|- align="center" bgcolor="#ccffcc"
| 26
| December 13
| @ Cleveland
|
|
|
|
|Richfield Coliseum
|
|- align="center" bgcolor="#ffcccc"
| 27
| December 14
| @ Indiana
|
|
|
|
|Market Square Arena
|
|- align="center" bgcolor="#ccffcc"
| 28
| December 15
| @ Chicago
|
|
|
|
|Chicago Stadium
|
|- align="center" bgcolor="#ffcccc"
| 29
| December 19
| Kansas City
|
|
|
|
|Capital Centre
|
|- align="center" bgcolor="#ccffcc"
| 30
| December 22
| Houston
|
|
|
|
|Capital Centre
|
|- align="center" bgcolor="#ffcccc"
| 31
| December 25
| Philadelphia
| L 92–95
|
|
|
| Capital Centre
| 14–17
|- align="center" bgcolor="#ffcccc"
| 32
| December 26
| @ New Jersey
|
|
|
|
|Rutgers Athletic Center
|
|- align="center" bgcolor="#ccffcc"
| 33
| December 27
| Milwaukee
|
|
|
|
|Capital Centre
|
|- align="center" bgcolor="#ffcccc"
| 34
| December 29
| San Diego
|
|
|
|
|Capital Centre
|

|- align="center" bgcolor="#ffcccc"
| 35
| January 1
| @ Portland
|
|
|
|
|Memorial Coliseum
|
|- align="center" bgcolor="#ccffcc"
| 36
| January 2
| @ Seattle
| W 139–134 (2OT)
|
|
|
| Kingdome
| 16–20
|- align="center" bgcolor="#ccffcc"
| 37
| January 4
| @ Golden State
|
|
|
|
|Oakland-Alameda County Coliseum Arena
|
|- align="center" bgcolor="#ccffcc"
| 38
| January 5
| @ Utah
|
|
|
|
|Salt Palace
|
|- align="center" bgcolor="#ccffcc"
| 39
| January 9
| Los Angeles
| W 103–101
|
|
|
| Capital Centre
| 19–20
|- align="center" bgcolor="#ffcccc"
| 40
| January 11
| @ Philadelphia
| L 106–119
|
|
|
| The Spectrum
| 19–21
|- align="center" bgcolor="#ccffcc"
| 41
| January 13
| Portland
|
|
|
|
|Capital Centre
|
|- align="center" bgcolor="#ffcccc"
| 42
| January 15
| Seattle
| L 100–120
|
|
|
| Capital Centre
| 20–22
|- align="center" bgcolor="#ffcccc"
| 43
| January 17
| @ Detroit
|
|
|
|
|Pontiac Silverdome
|
|- align="center" bgcolor="#ffcccc"
| 44
| January 18
| @ Houston
|
|
|
|
|The Summit
|
|- align="center" bgcolor="#ffcccc"
| 45
| January 19
| @ San Antonio
|
|
|
|
|HemisFair Arena
|
|- align="center" bgcolor="#ffcccc"
| 46
| January 22
| @ Cleveland
|
|
|
|
|Richfield Coliseum
|
|- align="center" bgcolor="#ffcccc"
| 47
| January 24
| New Jersey
|
|
|
|
|Capital Centre
|
|- align="center" bgcolor="#ccffcc"
| 48
| January 25
| @ Boston
| W 118–107
|
|
|
| Boston Garden
| 21–27
|- align="center" bgcolor="#ccffcc"
| 49
| January 27
| Golden State
|
|
|
|
|Capital Centre
|
|- align="center" bgcolor="#ffcccc"
| 50
| January 29
| @ Atlanta
|
|
|
|
|Omni Coliseum
|
|- align="center" bgcolor="#ccffcc"
| 51
| January 30
| Indiana
|
|
|
|
|Capital Centre
|
|- align="center" bgcolor="#ffcccc"
| 52
| January 31
| Boston
| L 103–119
|
|
|
| Capital Centre
| 23–29

|- align="center" bgcolor="#ffcccc"
| 53
| February 7
| @ Indiana
|
|
|
|
|Market Square Arena
|
|- align="center" bgcolor="#ffcccc"
| 54
| February 8
| @ Milwaukee
|
|
|
|
|MECCA Arena
|
|- align="center" bgcolor="#ffcccc"
| 55
| February 10
| @ Kansas City
|
|
|
|
|Kemper Arena
|
|- align="center" bgcolor="#ccffcc"
| 56
| February 12
| @ Denver
|
|
|
|
|McNichols Sports Arena
|
|- align="center" bgcolor="#ccffcc"
| 57
| February 13
| @ San Diego
|
|
|
|
|San Diego Sports Arena
|
|- align="center" bgcolor="#ffcccc"
| 58
| February 15
| @ Phoenix
|
|
|
|
|Arizona Veterans Memorial Coliseum
|
|- align="center" bgcolor="#ffcccc"
| 59
| February 17
| @ Los Angeles
| L 107–111
|
|
|
| The Forum
| 25–34
|- align="center" bgcolor="#ccffcc"
| 60
| February 21
| Cleveland
|
|
|
|
|Capital Centre
|
|- align="center" bgcolor="#ccffcc"
| 61
| February 22
| San Antonio
|
|
|
|
|Capital Centre
|
|- align="center" bgcolor="#ccffcc"
| 62
| February 24
| New York
|
|
|
|
|Capital Centre
|
|- align="center" bgcolor="#ffcccc"
| 63
| February 27
| @ Houston
|
|
|
|
|The Summit
|
|- align="center" bgcolor="#ccffcc"
| 64
| February 28
| Houston
|
|
|
|
|Capital Centre
|

|- align="center" bgcolor="#ccffcc"
| 65
| March 2
| Indiana
|
|
|
|
|Capital Centre
|
|- align="center" bgcolor="#ccffcc"
| 66
| March 4
| Detroit
|
|
|
|
|Capital Centre
|
|- align="center" bgcolor="#ffcccc"
| 67
| March 6
| New Jersey
|
|
|
|
|Capital Centre
|
|- align="center" bgcolor="#ccffcc"
| 68
| March 7
| @ Detroit
|
|
|
|
|Pontiac Silverdome
|
|- align="center" bgcolor="#ccffcc"
| 69
| March 9
| @ Boston
| W 133–128 (OT)
|
|
|
| Boston Garden
| 33–36
|- align="center" bgcolor="#ffcccc"
| 70
| March 11
| San Antonio
|
|
|
|
|Capital Centre
|
|- align="center" bgcolor="#ffcccc"
| 71
| March 12
| @ Philadelphia
| L 98–105
|
|
|
| The Spectrum
| 33–38
|- align="center" bgcolor="#ccffcc"
| 72
| March 14
| Houston
|
|
|
|
|Capital Centre
|
|- align="center" bgcolor="#ffcccc"
| 73
| March 16
| New York
|
|
|
|
|Capital Centre
|
|- align="center" bgcolor="#ffcccc"
| 74
| March 18
| @ San Antonio
|
|
|
|
|HemisFair Arena
|
|- align="center" bgcolor="#ffcccc"
| 75
| March 19
| @ Atlanta
|
|
|
|
|Omni Coliseum
|
|- align="center" bgcolor="#ccffcc"
| 76
| March 20
| Philadelphia
| W 119–113 (OT)
|
|
|
| Capital Centre
| 35–41
|- align="center" bgcolor="#ccffcc"
| 77
| March 22
| @ New York
|
|
|
|
|Madison Square Garden
|
|- align="center" bgcolor="#ccffcc"
| 78
| March 23
| Detroit
|
|
|
|
|Capital Centre
|
|- align="center" bgcolor="#ffcccc"
| 79
| March 25
| Boston
| L 95–96
|
|
|
| Capital Centre
| 37–42
|- align="center" bgcolor="#ffcccc"
| 80
| March 27
| @ Cleveland
|
|
|
|
|Richfield Coliseum
|
|- align="center" bgcolor="#ccffcc"
| 81
| March 28
| Atlanta
|
|
|
|
|Capital Centre
|
|- align="center" bgcolor="#ccffcc"
| 82
| March 30
| @ New Jersey
|
|
|
|
|Rutgers Athletic Center
|

Playoffs

|- align="center" bgcolor="#ffcccc"
| 1
| April 2
| @ Philadelphia
| L 96–111
| Kevin Grevey (34)
| Wes Unseld (18)
| Kevin Porter (7)
| Spectrum12,567
| 0–1
|- align="center" bgcolor="#ffcccc"
| 2
| April 4
| Philadelphia
| L 104–112
| Elvin Hayes (26)
| Elvin Hayes (12)
| Kevin Grevey (5)
| Capital Centre18,397
| 0–2
|-

Player statistics

Season

Playoffs

Awards and records

Transactions

References

See also
 1979-80 NBA season

Washington Wizards seasons
Was
1979 in sports in Washington, D.C.
Washing